Bhoja was a medieval Indian king who ruled Kannauj in the late 8th century CE 

His parents were Dunduka and Padma, Dunduka's queen. Dunduka made several futile attempts to kill Bhoja. Later, Bhoja killed Dunduka for the throne in his royal court.

After killing his father, Bhoja ascended the throne with the favour and support of Dunduka's subjects and high officials. Bhoja, like his father Dunduka and grandfather Āma, became a parama Jaina. He fought off an invasion by an invading Muslim army. He either retired as a king after a short rule, or his kingdom was annexed by the Ayudhas, who established a new dynasty, or he was deposed by the Pratiharas.

References

Indian monarchs
Kannauj

Year of birth missing
Year of death missing